Words is the debut studio album by Australian country music singer Sherrié Austin. The album was released on 15 July 1997 via Arista Nashville. She was previously signed to Interscope Records as the duo of Colourhaus, which charted a Top 50 single on the Billboard Hot 100.

From the album, four singles were released, however, only two made the Top 40 of the Hot Country Singles & Tracks (now Hot Country Songs) chart. "Lucky in Love", "One Solitary Tear", "Put Your Heart into It", and "Innocent Man" were released, charting to #34, #41, #34, and #71, respectively.

Track listing

Personnel
 Pat Buchanan – electric guitar
 Joe Chemay – bass
 Blair Daly – percussion
 Diana DeWitt – backing vocals
 Dan Dugmore – steel guitar 
 Larry Franklin – fiddle
 Paul Franklin – steel guitar
 John Hobbs – keyboards
 Dann Huff – electric guitar 
 Mary Ann Kennedy – backing vocals
 Paul Leim – drums
 Anthony Martin – keyboards
 Donna McElroy – backing vocals 
 Kim Parent – backing vocals
 Will Rambeaux – acoustic guitar
 Michael Rhodes – bass
 Tom Roady – percussion
 Pam Rose – backing vocals
 John Wesley Ryles – backing vocals
 Hank Singer – fiddle
 Biff Watson – acoustic guitar
 Dennis Wilson – backing vocals

Chart performance

References

1997 debut albums
Sherrié Austin albums
Arista Records albums